Ingunn Utsi (born 1948) is a Norwegian Sami sculptor, painter and book illustrator from Repvågstranda in Norway's Nordkapp Municipality. In recognition of her contributions to Sami culture, in 2019 she was elected an honorary member of the Sami Cultural Association (Samisk Kunstnerforbund, SDS) One of her most celebrated works is Gudni II (Homage II), a sculpture she created in 2016 on the trunk of a pine tree in the Art Park of Ii, Finland.

Biography
Born in November 1948 near Repvågstranda in the Nordkapp Municipality, she was brought up by parents who only spoke Sami at home, considering it important for her to use the native language rather than Norwegian. She was possibly the last child in the area to have Sami as her mother tongue as those born after 1953 were raised in Norwegian. From 1955, she attended the Norwegian-speaking boarding school in Repvågstranda where her elder brother Oliver helped her with Norwegian. After the school was closed in 1957, she continued her education at the Solvang boarding school in Sarnes, continuing at the junior high school in Honningsvåg and at the high school in Alta.

She went on to study Sami at the University of Oslo but the "standard" Sami she learnt was quite different from her mother tongue. She then studied at the Trondheim Art School, first developing her drawing but soon specializing in sculpture.

Utsi now works mainly as a sculptor with a combination of materials including wood, plastic, stone and metal. She explains her approach as follows:

"When I am working with three-dimensional wooden objects, I almost never make any sketches. I work directly with the material and let it talk to my mind, my eyes and hands. In many ways, I can ‘see’ the result by letting the material be my guide, but there are surprises or demands in the wood itself, and I have to take that into consideration. While shaping the material, it grows and becomes my piece of art."

Utsi's work has been exhibited widely and is in the permanent collections of various museums. In October 2008, several of her works were presented in a solo exhibition arranged by the Alta Cultural Association. These included a series of her drawings expressing ideas of "timeless time" as well as a floor-based installation combining metal and plexiglass.

References

External links
Ingunn Utsi from Sámi Dáiddačehpiid Searvi, including CV
Video showing Utsi creating her Gudni II (Homage II) sculpture

1948 births
Living people
People from Nordkapp
Norwegian Sámi people
20th-century Norwegian artists
21st-century Norwegian artists
Norwegian sculptors
Norwegian women sculptors
Norwegian painters
Norwegian women painters
Norwegian illustrators
Norwegian women illustrators
University of Oslo alumni